Sony Computer Entertainment Japan may refer to:

Sony Computer Entertainment (SCE), from 1993 to 2016, before it was re-structured as Sony Interactive Entertainment (SIE).
SIE's first-person development studios based in Japan, under SIE Worldwide Studios.
Japan Studio, a first-party development studio.